McClanahan is an Irish surname that is derived from several Anglicized forms of the Gaelic surname Mac Lennacháin or Mac Gille Onchon.

Etymology

The New Dictionary of American Family Names translates Mac Lennacháin as "the son of little Leannach" and Mac Gille Onchon as "the son of the servant of Oncho." Leanach means "possessing mantles". Mac Lennacháin is sometimes written as MacClannachan, with variations including MacClenaghan, McClenaghan, M'Clenaghan. Gille is a Gaelic word meaning "servant", more specifically a professional guide for sportsmen, especially in fishing and deerstalking. Onchu, meaning "Mighty hound", was an Irish warrior who participated in the Irish battle of Cuil Corra in 649 CE.

Family motto

The family motto, as recorded in the McClanahan coat of arms, is "Virtue Is My Honor."

Points of origin

The McClanahan name is also "Orange" or Protestant Irish, mostly coming from the Ulster area. It is possible that the McClanahan family are Scotch-Irish, descended from those whose blood is a mixture of the native Irish and the Scots who came to Ireland in the plantation of Ulster. It is also possible that a branch may have been native to Ireland. They are of Gaelic origin and have the bloodlines of both the Gaels of Erin and the Gaels of Albin.

Notable  people

Brent McClanahan (born 1952),  American football player
Craig McClanahan (born 1953), American programmer
Ed McClanahan, American novelist, essayist, and professor
Elijah McClanahan (1770–1857), American planter and soldier
Elizabeth A. McClanahan (born 1959), Justice of the Supreme Court of Virginia
Jeffrey McClanahan, American novelist
Kim McClenaghan (born 1974), South African poet and writer
Meade McClanahan (c.1894–1959), American industrial engineer and businessman
Pete McClanahan (1906–1987), American pinch hitter in Major League Baseball
Randy McClanahan (born 1954), American football player
Rebecca McClanahan (born 1951), Democratic Representative from Missouri
Rob McClanahan (born 1958), American ice hockey player
Rue McClanahan (1934–2010), American actress and comedian
Scott McClanahan, American writer, economist, explorer, and martial artist
Shane McClanahan (born 1997), American baseball pitcher
Timothy R. McClanahan (born 1957), American biologist and conservation zoologist

References